A kick start is the task of using the foot to start a motorcycle. The term may also refer to:

Technology
 Kickstart (Amiga), the bootstrap of the Amiga computers developed by Commodore
 Kickstart (Linux), a network installation system for some Linux distributions 
 Yahoo! Kickstart, a professional network from Yahoo!
 BlackBerry KickStart, the codename for the Pearl smartphone
 Kickstart (orthosis), the Kickstart Walking System by Cadence Biomedical

Organizations
 Kickstart Kids, a US charity founded by Chuck Norris
 Kickstarter, a US-based global crowdfunding platform
 KickStart International, a non-profit organization that provides irrigation technology to farmers in Africa

Entertainment
 Kick Start (TV series), a UK television series on motor bike competitions, and a spinoff computer game 
 Kick Start (album), an album by the English band The Lambrettas
 "Kick Start", single by Jerry Harrison
 "Kickstarts" (song), a 2010 song by Example

Other uses

 Kickstart, Homes and Communities Agency funding programme for private housing in the UK

See also
 Project KickStart, project management software
 Mountain Dew Kickstart, a line of energizing drinks made by Mountain Dew